Garbh Chioch Mhor (1013 m) is a mountain in the Northwest Highlands of Scotland. It lies in the Lochaber region, between Loch Nevis and Loch Quoich.

A very rocky and remote mountain, it is usually climbed in conjunction with its higher neighbour Sgurr na Ciche. Walks usually start from Loch Arkaig several miles to the east.

References

Marilyns of Scotland
Munros
Mountains and hills of the Northwest Highlands
One-thousanders of Scotland